Otlichny was a  of the Soviet and later Russian navy.

Development and design 

The project began in the late 1960s when it was becoming obvious to the Soviet Navy that naval guns still had an important role particularly in support of amphibious landings, but existing gun cruisers and destroyers were showing their age. A new design was started, employing a new 130 mm automatic gun turret.

Construction and career 
Otlichny was laid down on 22 April 1978 and launched on 21 March 1981 by Zhdanov Shipyard in Leningrad.  She was commissioned on 30 September 1983.

On 1 October 1991 she was transferred to the 43rd Division of Missile Ships (43 DRK) of the 7th Operational Squadron (7 OPSK), was preparing to go to Sevastopol for repairs, but was transferred to the reserve of the 1st category.

In August 1993, she was preparing for repairs in Leningrad, from 4 January 1994 he was preparing for repairs in Murmansk, but did not go anywhere and was put into the 2nd category reserve.

On 20 November 1994 she returned to the 56 Bram lineup.

Excluded from the lists of the fleet on 22 November 1998 the flag was lowered on the ship. Disbanded on 30 December 1998.

Gallery

References 

1981 ships
Ships built at Severnaya Verf
Cold War destroyers of the Soviet Union
Sovremenny-class destroyers